The 1901 VMI Keydets football team represented the Virginia Military Institute (VMI) in their 11th season of organized football. The Keydets went 4–3 under second-year head coach Sam Walker.

Schedule

References

VMI
VMI Keydets football seasons
VMI Keydets football